Hartlaub's gull (Chroicocephalus hartlaubii), also known as the king gull, it is a small gull. It was formerly sometimes considered to be a subspecies of the silver gull (C. novaehollandiae), and, as is the case with many gulls, it has traditionally been placed in the genus Larus but is now placed in the genus Chroicocephalus. The species’ name commemorates the German physician and zoologist, Gustav Hartlaub.

Description

Hartlaub's gull is 36–38 cm in length. It is a mainly white gull with a grey back and upperwings, black wingtips with conspicuous white "mirrors", and a dark red bill and legs. When breeding it has a very faint lavender grey hood, but otherwise has a plain white head. Sexes are similar. This species differs from the slightly larger grey-headed gull in its thinner, darker bill, deeper red legs, paler, plainer head, and dark eyes. It takes two years to reach maturity. Juvenile birds have a brown band across the wings. They differ from same-age grey-headed gulls in that they lack a black terminal tail band, less dark areas in the wings, darker legs, and a white head.

Distribution and habitat
The gull is a non-migratory breeding resident endemic to the Atlantic Ocean coastline of South Africa and Namibia. Although it is predominantly coastal or estuarine, it is not a pelagic species, and is rarely seen at sea far from land. About one half of the total population, currently estimated at about 30 000 birds, lives within the Greater Cape Town area. It has accommodated well to humans, and can become very tame around habitations. Although it is a relatively rare species, about the tenth rarest of the world's 50 or so gull species, it is common in its range and is widely regarded in Cape Town as a nuisance, fouling buildings and bathing in urban ponds. It has, at times, been a hazard to aircraft near airports.

Behaviour
Like most gulls, Hartlaub's is highly gregarious in winter, both when feeding or in evening roosts. This is a noisy species, especially at colonies. The call is a raucous crow-like kaaarrh. This species is frequently the subject of complaints about the noise it makes in urban areas.

Breeding
Hartlaub's gull breeds in large colonies, and the main traditional breeding colony for the Cape Town area is on Robben Island. The adults fly to the mainland to find food for their chicks, a round trip of about 24 km.

Feeding
The species is omnivorous like most Larus gulls, and they will scavenge at tips and feed on scraps as well as seeking suitable small prey, often by wading in shallow water.

References

 Harrison, Seabirds 
 Ian Sinclair, Phil Hockey and Warwick Tarboton, SASOL Birds of Southern Africa (Struik 2002) 
 Pons J.M., Hassanin, A., and Crochet P.A.(2005). Phylogenetic relationships within the Laridae (Charadriiformes: Aves) inferred from mitochondrial markers. Molecular Phylogenetics and Evolution 37(3):686–699

External links
 Species text in The Atlas of Southern African Birds

Hartlaub's gull
Birds of Southern Africa
Hartlaub's gull
Hartlaub's gull